Womens Bay or Womens Bay may refer to:

Womens Bay, Alaska, a census-designated place in Kodiak Island Borough, Alaska, in the United States
Women's Bay, Barbados, also known as Silver Sands, in the south of the island of Barbados